International Talent Support (ITS) is a platform created to give support and visibility to young talents in the field of fashion design, design of accessories and jewelry. The most artistic-oriented designers are also challenged with ITS Artwork, a purely artistic contest.

The 16th edition which will be held once again in Trieste on 27 June 2018.

Contestants are selected from more than 80 countries around the world. After this selection process, they are invited to Trieste to present their works and are evaluated by a special jury that awards the prizes in the competition. ITS is not just a contest, it includes a Creative Archive showcasing projects of the past finalists: a collection of 16,000 portfolios, 220 dresses, 80 jewelry pieces and 120 accessories, and more than 700 digital photo projects. In addition, it produces a yearly trends report "The Seismographer" and has built a wide network made up of designers, journalists, opinion leaders, design teachers, head hunters, heads of studio and more.

The platform was founded and is directed by Barbara Franchin.

Here are some of the past ITS jurors: the performance artist Marina Abramovic, photographers Nick Knight, Ari Marcopoulos and Sarah Moon, the Editor in Chief of Vogue Italy Franca Sozzani, the founder of Business of Fashion Imran Amed, the former head curator of the Costume Institute at the Metropolitan Museum in New York Harold Koda the singer-songwriter Mika and designers such as Raf Simons, Viktor & Rolf, Consuelo Castiglioni, Manish Arora as well as journalists like Hilary Alexander, Angelo Flaccavento and Cathy Horyn.

Many past finalists hold key positions in the fashion industry, like Demna Gvasalia (Creative Director Balenciaga & founder Vetements), Aitor Throup (Executive Creative Director G-Star Raw) and Peter Pilotto (eponymous line).

ITS 2016 
2016 marked the fifteenth birthday of ITS, an anniversary edition that welcomed in the jury Demna Gvasalia (founder and artistic director of Vetements and artistic director of Balenciaga), designer Iris Van Herpen and AltaRoma President Silvia Venturini Fendi, while the theme of the event was “Utopia.

Winners 
 Mayako Kano, ITS Fashion Award in partnership with OTB
 Niels Gundtoft Hansen & Anna Bornhold, OTB Award
 Helen Kirkum, ITS Accessories Award in partnership with YKK
 Young Jin Jang, YKK Award
 Marco Baitella, ITS Artwork Award in partnership with Swatch
 Jana Zornik, Swatch Award
 Hazuki Katagai, Swatch Art Peace Hotel Award
 Sari Rathel, ITS Jewelry Award in partnership with Swarovski
 Tatiana Lobanova, Swarovski Award
 Justin Smith, Generali Future Award
 Anna Bornhold, Modateca Deanna Award
 Helen Kirkum, Vogue Talents Award

ITS 2015 
The jury for this edition featured, among others, Massimo Giorgetti (Founder and Creative Director of MSGM), Carlo Capasa (President of the National Chamber of Italian Fashion) and Oriole Cullen (Acting Senior Curator of Contemporary Fashion, Victoria & Albert Museum). Aitor Throup, a finalist in 2006, received a lifetime achievement award. The concept for this edition was "THE FUTURE".

Winners 
 Paula Knorr, ITS Fashion Award in partnership with OTB
 Yuko Koike, OTB Award and Modateca Deanna Award
 Jenifer Thévenaz-Burdet, Eyes on Talents Award
 Elina Määttänen, Vogue Talents Award
 Isabel Helf, ITS Accessories Award in partnership with YKK
 Bianca Chong, YKK Fastening Award
 Hiroki Kataoka, ITS Artwork Award in partnership with Swatch
 Shay Tako, Swatch Award
 Alexis Gautier, Swatch Art Peace Hotel Award
 In Wai Kwok, ITS Jewelry Award in partnership with Swarovski
 Kota Okuda, ITS Jewelry Award in partnership with Swarovski
 Yun Sun Jang, Swarovski Award
 Yang Wang, Samsung Galaxy Award
 Aitor Throup, Generali Special Award

ITS 2014 
Consuelo Castiglioni (MARNI), Nick Knight, Nicholas Kirkwood and pop star Mika (in the jury for the new ITS ARTWORK contest) were among the jurors. On July 12, the day of the final evening, the event reached the 9th position as a global trending topic on social networks. CNN [4] and France 2 covered the event. The concept for this edition was "Lucid Dreams"

Winners 
 Katherine Roberts-Wood, Fashion Collection of the Year and Vogue Talents Award for fashion
 Zoe Waters, Diesel Award
 Anita Hirlekar, Fashion Special Prize
 Natalija Mencej, Camera Nazionale della Moda Italiana Award
 Yasuto Kimura, Showstudio Prize
 Anna Bornhold, Modateca Award
 Mirja Pitkaart, Accessories Collection of the Year
 Takafumi Arai, YKK Special Award
 Ivana Damjanovic, YKK Award and Eyes on Talents Award
 Maiko Takeda, Vogue Talents Award for accessories
 Virginia Burlina, Swatch Award
 Noriko Nakazato, Swarovski Jewelry Award
 Lior Shulak, Swarovski Jewelry Award
 Leonie Barth, Samsung GALAXY Award

ITS 2013 
ITS becomes even more present on social with the launch of a live feed that collects any ITS related content. Nicola Formichetti, Carla Sozzani and Yasuhiro Mihara were among the jurors. This edition was characterized by the concept "The Physics of Creativity".

Winners 
 Han Chul Lee, Fashion Collection of the Year and Vogue Talents Award
 Xiao Li, Diesel Award
 Tomohiro Sato, Fashion Special Prize and Modateca Award
 Nelly Hoffmann, Yoox.com Award
 Felix Chabluk Smith, Business of Fashion Award
 Leonard Kahlcke, Accessories Collection of the Year
 Percy Lau, YKK Award
 Cat Potter, Eyes on Talents Award
 Youngwon Kim, Vogue Talents Award for Accessories
 Lili Colley, Swarovski Elements Jewelry Award
 Milko Boyarov, Swatch Award

ITS 2012 
In 2012, the performance artist Marina Abramovic was in the fashion competition jury with Renzo Rosso and the fashion blogger Susie Bubble. The jury also featured two past finalists, Aitor Throup and Mark Fast, both of whom have since become famous for their respective fashion lines. This edition's concept played with two extremes, "Good or Evil".

Winners 
 Ichiro Suzuki, Fashion Collection of the Year
 Marius Janusauskas, Diesel Award and D-La Repubblica Award
 Luke Brooks, Fashion Special Prize
 Mark Goldenberg, Avery Dennison Brand Innovation Award and Vogue Talents Award for fashion
 Isabel Vollrath, Saturday Night Fever Award
 Shengwei Wang, Modateca Award
 Ana Rajcevic, Accessories Collection of the Year
 Benjamin John Hall, YKK Award
 Victoria Spruce, Vogue Talents Award for accessories
 Xiao Zi Yang, Swarovski Elements Jewelry Award

ITS#TEN 
The 2011 edition marked the contest's 10th anniversary, with a jury that included Hilary Alexander, the Academy Award for Photography Dante Spinotti and featured the return of Viktor & Rolf. It was the year of the launch of ITS JEWELRY, the competition devoted entirely to jewelry. Shaun Samson, the winner of the Fashion Collection of the Year, participated in the London Fashion Week with his fashion line a short while later.

Winners 
 Shaun Samson, Fashion Collection of the Year
 Niran Avisar, Diesel Award
 Kristian Guerra, Fashion Special Prize and D-La Repubblica Award
 Fah Chakshuvej, Maison Martin Margiela Award
 Ruth Green, Skunkfunk Sustainability Award
 Kevin Kramp, Modateca Award
 Oliver Ruuger, Accessories Collection of the Year
 Laura Amstein, YKK Award
 Anna Schwamborn, Modamont Award
 Sarah Vedel Hurtigkarl and Raluca Grada, Swarovski Elements Jewelry Award
 Nika Kupyrova, Disaronno Photo Award
 Gerardo Vizmanos, SVA PhotoGlobal Award

ITS#NINE 
The designers Viktor & Rolf participated as first-time jurors and Nina Nitsche (Maison Martin Margiela) was also part of the jury. Shortly after the event, the winner of Accessories Collection of the Year Sarah Williams established a partnership with another Accessories finalist, Kirsty Ward, launching an exclusive line of custom made accessories.

Winners 
 Takashi Nishiyama, Fashion Collection of the Year
 Michael Kampe, Diesel Award
 Yong Kyun Shin, Fashion Special Prize
 Niels Peeraer, RA Award
 Sarah Williams, Accessories Collection of the Year and Absolut Award
 Emma Yeo, YKK Award
 Yuwen Lu, Modamont Award

ITS#EIGHT 
Yuima Nakazato became the second finalist in the history of ITS to be selected for two different competitions in two different editions. The edition concept transformed ITS in the "Greatest Show of All", drawing inspiration from the touring circus shows of the early 20th century.

Winners 
 Mason Jung, Fashion Collection of the Year
 Yuima Nakazato, YKK Award
 Ali Forbes, Crystallized Accessories Award
 Chau Har Lee, Accessories Collection of the Year
 Elise Gettliffe, I-D Styling Award
 Alice Knackfuss, Diesel Award
 Masha Lamzina, Fashion Special Prize
 Michael Van Der Ham, Vertice Award
 Saana Wang, Mini Clubman Photo Award
 Silvia Noferi, Pitti Immagine Photo Award
 Monica Lozano Red, Air Dolomiti Photo Award
 Noemie Goudal, Pitti Immagine Photo Award
 Clare Bottomley, ITS Photoweb and SVA Photoglobal Award

ITS#SEVEN 
Mark Fast's knitwear attracted everyone's attention, and was the prelude to a brand that received a lot of attention as a result of ITS. The finalists of the photography competition Mashid Mohadjerin won the World Press Photo award for a project that started immediately after ITS. Designer Gareth Pugh and photographer Sarah Moon were among the jurors.

Winners 
 Valentim Manuel Estevão Quaresma, Accessories Collection of the Year
 Benjamin Shun Lai Ng, YKK Award
 Tomasz Donocik, YKK Special Prize
 Elise Gettliffe, Fashion Special Prize
 Yuima Nakazato, Vertice Award
 Alithia Spuri-Zampetti, Maria Luisa Award
 Mark Fast, I-D Styling Award
 Heikki Salonen, Diesel Award
 David Steinhorst, Fashion Collection of the Year
 Mashid Mohadjerin, ITS Photoweb
 Debora Vrizzi, Pitti Immagine Photo Award
 Kazutaka Nagashima, Mini Clubman Photo Award
 Matthieu Lavanchy, SVA Photoglobal Award
 Venetia Dearden, Air Dolomiti Photo Award
 Martine Fougeron, Pitti Immagine Photo Award

ITS#SIX 
The generation of young talents selected in 2007 featured many finalists that, following ITS, made a name for themselves thanks to their respective brands: Justin Smith, David Longshaw, Taro Horiuchi, Mareunrol, Ek Thongprasert, Heaven Tanudiredja (who was a finalist in both Fashion  Accessories, anticipating the launch of her own line of jewelry).

Winners 
 Liron Braker, YKK Accessory Award
 Anna Sheldon, YKK Special Award
 Justin Smith, i-D Styling Award and Maria Luisa Award
 Susanne Happle, Accessories Collection of the Year
 Ek Thongprasert, Fashion Collection of the Year and Develon Award
 Migle Kacerauskiene, Fashion Special Prize
 Heaven Tanudiredja, Vertice Award
 Taro Horiuchi, Diesel Award
 Maria Giulia Giorgiani, Pitti Immagine Photo Award and Finalist Involved In The Mini Clubman Tour
 May Heek, SVA Photoglobal Award
 Jing Quek, MINI International Photo Award and Pitti Immagine Photo Award

ITS#FIVE 
In 2006 the ITS ACCESSORIES contest was inaugurated. Aitor Throup was the revelation of the year with a menswear collection that redesigned the production processes. Franca Sozzani, Raf Simons and Cathy Horyn were on the jury.

Winners 
 Heather Blake, Accessories Collection of the Year
 Maria Hjelm, YKK Accessory Award
 Mikio Sakabe, Special Jury Prize
 Matthieu Blazy, Maria Luisa Award
 Tamar Daniel (Schreiber), WGSN Best Portfolio
 Aitor Throup, Fashion Collection of the Year and I-D Styling Award and ITS 2015 Generali Special Award
 Daniel Ivarsson, Diesel Award
 Catherine Sundqvist, VMAN / V Magazine Award
 Remigiusz Pyrdol, MINI International Photo Award and Le Book Award and Stage Fabbrica

ITS#FOUR 
Antonio Marras, Boudicca and Antonio Berardi were on the jury. The ITS PHOTO contest was launched and its jury featured the founder of Visionaire Cecilia Dean. Christopher de Vos, who later worked for Vivienne Westwood before joining forces with Peter Pilotto's homonymous brand, was one of the finalists.

Winners 
 Christoph Froehlich, Diesel Award
 Eli Effenberger, Maria Luisa Award and Special Jury Prize
 Marga Weimans, I-D Styling Award
 Mie Albaek Nielsen and Caroline Hansen, Ingeo Sustainability Award
 Ryo Yamada, WGSN Best Portfolio Award
 Marcus Lereng Wilmont, Collection of the Year
 Danielle Mourning, MINI International Photo Award

ITS#THREE 
Yoshikazu Yamagata was among the winners of 2004. He would later set up a school in Tokyo that would produce numerous ITS finalists. Peter Pilotto was among the finalists. In the following years he created the Peter Pilotto brand together with a 2005 finalist, Christopher de Vos. Raf Simons was in the jury together with Richard Buckley, Hilary Alexander and Ennio Capasa.

Winners 
 Iris Eibelwimmer, Maria Luisa Award
 Demna Gvasalia, Collection of the Year
 Peter Pilotto, Maria Luisa Award
 Takashi Sugioka, 3rd Jury Prize
 Steven Hoffman, 2nd Jury Prize
 Yoshikazu Yamagata, Special Prize, Ingeo Sustainability Award and WGSN Best Portfolio
 Lesley Mobo, Diesel Award

ITS#TWO 
The winner Cathy Pill had the honour of being invited to present her collection during the Parisian fashion week, where she continued to present her brand for nearly a decade. Dombrovicz Laurent, Xavier Delcour and Jenny Meirens were some of the jurors. Fabrizio Talia, winner of the Best Womenswear Collection Award, later joined forces with Justin Smith – the two met in 2007 – for the launch of the project (Es) * Artisanal, chosen as a finalist in 2010.

Winners 
 Slobodan Mihajlović, Maria Luisa Award
 Cathy Pill, Collection of the Year
 Anne Ventzel, Best Menswear Collection
 Fabrizio Talia, Best Womenswear Collection
 Akihiro Kiuchi, Jury Prize
 Teppei Sugaya, Diesel Award

ITS#ONE 
The jury of the first edition of the International Talent Support featured, among others, Isabella Blow, Editor in Chief of Nylon Magazine Marvin Jarrett, Director of i-D magazine Terry Jones and the Creative Director of Black Book Magazine Evan L.Schindler.

Winners 
 Anais Buscail and Vanessa Raveau, PlayStation
 Assaf Bitton, INTESABCI Award
 Bernadett Penkov, Dupont Total Look
 Céline Gautron, Dupont Shirt/Trousers Category
 Chu Po Ho, Dupont Knitwear Top Category
 Daniele Controversio, Collection of the Year and Dupont Trousers category
 Einav Zucker, Diesel Award
 Elisa Grazioli, PlayStation
 Erik Jan Frenken, Best Womenswear Collection
 Rianne Caminada, PlayStation
 Roel Ruyten, PlayStation
 Vishvajeet Dhir, Best Menswear Collection
 Goldy Serussi, Dupont Shirt/Trousers Category

References 

Fashion organizations